Teniloxazine (Lucelan, Metatone), also known as sufoxazine and sulfoxazine, is a drug which is marketed in Japan. Though initially investigated as a neuroprotective and nootropic agent for the treatment of cerebrovascular insufficiency in the 1980s, it was ultimately developed and approved as an antidepressant instead. It acts as a potent norepinephrine reuptake inhibitor, with fair selectivity over the serotonin and dopamine transporters, and also behaves as an antagonist of the 5-HT2A receptor.

See also 
 Bifemelane
 Indeloxazine
 Viloxazine

References 

Antidepressants
Morpholines
Thiophenes
Phenol ethers